Pradhanmantri is an Indian television political documentary series, hosted by actor-director Shekhar Kapur on Hindi news channel ABP News. It premiered on 13 July 2013. It aimed to bring to the audience never-seen-before facts of Indian history. The weekly programme chronicles the history of India from 1947 to the present day. The TV series was hosted by the renowned film-maker, actor and host Shekhar Kapur and directed by Puneet Sharma. It was a unique attempt to present the changes in the country during the tenures of 13 prime ministers in the last 65 years. Pradhanmantri aired every Saturday at 10 pm. Raghi Papiya Joshi and Sohan Thakur are casting directors.

The series aired the news telecast of death of Indira Gandhi on Doordarshan by Salma Sultan. Initially conceptualised for 23 episodes, Pradhanmantri was extended to 26 episodes with the last episode aired on 4 January 2014. The show was earlier rumoured to be titled Idea of India.

Pradhanmantri has been re-telecasted in Bengali on ABP Ananda from 14 December 2013, hosted by Bengali actor Dhritiman Chatterjee and re-telecasted in Marathi language on ABP Majha with the name Sinhasan and hosted by Marathi actor Vikram Gokhale from 23 November 2013.

Season 2, christened as Pradhanmantri 2, premiered on ABP News on January 25, 2020. It is again being hosted by actor-director Shekhar Kapur.“Pradhanmantri Season -II" will discuss the ideas which will give India its due place in the comity of great nations.

Cast

Shekhar Kapoor as the Narrator
Saurabh Dubey as Jawaharlal Nehru
Navni Parihar as Indira Gandhi
Surendra Pal as B. R. Ambedkar
Shishir Sharma as Hari Singh
Anang Desai as Sheikh Abdullah
Prithvi Zutshi as Vallabhbhai Patel
Shiv Kumar Subramaniam as K. Kamaraj
Adi Irani as V. P. Menon
Tej Sapru as Muhammad Ali Jinnah
Amit Behl as Zulfikar Ali Bhutto
Rio Kapadia as Sam Manekshaw
Achyut Potdar as Jayaprakash Narayan
Ravi Jhankal as P. V. Narasimha Rao
Mohit Chauhan as Major general J. F. R. Jacob & Rajiv Gandhi
Harsh Chhaya as Sanjay Gandhi
Pankaj Berry as Muhammad Mahabat Khan III
Rajesh Vivek as Raj Narain
 Anwar Fatehan as Charan Singh
 Vinod Kapoor as N.K. Singh, CBI joint director
Deepak Jethi as Jarnail Singh Bhindranwale
Devaj Parikh as Narendra Modi
Ramesh Ramamoorthy as APJ Abdul Kalam
Mohit Chauhan as Rajiv Gandhi
Suzanne Bernert as Sonia Gandhi
Shiv Kumar Subramaniam as K. Kamaraj
Vaquar Shaikh as Chandra Shekhar
Akhil Mishra as Lal Bahadur Shastri
Dharmesh Tiwari as Jaswant Singh
Kishori Shahane as Pupul Jayakar
Dinesh Kaushik as Siddhartha Shankar Ray
 Naresh Suri as A. A. K. Niazi
 Ashwin Kaushal as Hanwant Singh, ruler of Jaisalmer
Bhupindder Bhoopii as Harchand Singh Longowal
Onkar Nath Mishra as Swami Karpatri

Episodes

Reception
Senior Bharatiya Janata Party leader L. K. Advani praised Pradhanmantri on his blog and public platforms. Retired Indian Police Service (IPS) officer Kiran Bedi and Sunil Shashtri (son of Lal Bahadur Shastri) also praised the series.

Social media
The show noticed a huge engagement on social media with the #Pradhanmantri trending on Twitter for over 4 days in India on its launch. The hash-tag was promoted heavily by ABP News through a contest on Twitter. The lucky winners of the #Pradhanmantri contest were given K Touch A15 smartphone and a set of 19 books by Rajkamal Prakashan Private Limited on topics like Maanav Samskrithi, modern India, Lokayuth, Bhagath Singh, Prakrithi, Saahithya as gratifications. #Pradhanmantri  trended for more than 56 hours, had almost 2.2 million views on YouTube, and had more than 1.2 million mentions on Twitter in 25 weeks.

Season II
Pradhanmantri II (The Prime Minister) is an Indian television political documentary series, hosted by actor-director Shekhar Kapur on Hindi news channel ABP News. This second season premiered on 25 January 2020. The first episodes showed the integration of Kashmir into the Union of India.

Cast
Saurabh Dubey as Jawaharlal Nehru
Anang Desai as Sheikh Abdullah
Prithvi Zutshi as Vallabhbhai Patel
Vaquar Shaikh as Hari Singh
Amit Behl as Zulfikar Ali Bhutto
Navni Parihar as Indira Gandhi
Shahab Khan as Y. D. Gundevia
Shekhar Kapoor as the Narrator

Episodes Season II

See also
 7 RCR
 Bharatvarsh
 Bharat Ek Khoj
 Samvidhaan
 Satyamev Jayate

References

External links
 
 Pradhanmantri on ABP News

ABP News original programming
Hindi-language television shows
Television series about the history of India
2013 Indian television series debuts
Indian documentary television series
2014 Indian television series endings
Indian political television series
Political history of India
Television series about prime ministers
Cultural depictions of prime ministers of India
Indian historical television series
Cultural depictions of B. R. Ambedkar
Cultural depictions of Jawaharlal Nehru
Cultural depictions of Indira Gandhi
Cultural depictions of Muhammad Ali Jinnah
Partition of India in fiction
Cultural depictions of Vallabhbhai Patel
Cultural depictions of Rajiv Gandhi
Cultural depictions of Narendra Modi
Cultural depictions of Manmohan Singh
P. V. Narasimha Rao
Memorials to Lal Bahadur Shastri
Morarji Desai
Memorials to Chaudhary Charan Singh
V. P. Singh administration
Gowda administration
Gujral administration
Atal Bihari Vajpayee
Chandra Shekhar administration
Abdullah political family
Zulfikar Ali Bhutto
Memorials to Jayaprakash Narayan
Nehru–Gandhi family
A. P. J. Abdul Kalam
Jaswant Singh